Xbox app (also known as Xbox SmartGlass) is an application for the Xbox platform. Some games developed for Microsoft's Xbox 360 and Xbox One are compatible with the SmartGlass application. SmartGlass is also compatible with some applications and multimedia content produced for the consoles.

Xbox 360 Games

Xbox One Games

Xbox 360 Applications

Xbox One Applications

Live events

Movies

References

Xbox (console) software
Xbox One
Xbox 360